Stars and Roses (orig. Ai ren tong zhi)is a 1989 Hong Kong drama film directed by Taylor Wong starring Andy Lau as a photo journalist from Hong Kong and Cherie Chung as a Vietnamese translator.

Plot
Lau Kai Cho (Andy Lau) travels to Vietnam for a story. Once in Vietnam, he briefly meets Yuen Hung (Cherie Chung), a translator and is involved in an accident after crashing a motorised rickshaw. The courts hand him a prison sentence in a strict prison where he is subject to a number of horrible punishments.

While in prison, he meets Yuen's brother, upon his release, Lau and Yuen become more friendly until Lau is imprisoned again for anti-government activity. Sentenced to 3 years he plots to escape from prison taking Yuen Hung's brother with him.

Cast 
 Andy Lau as Lau Kai Cho
 Cherie Chung as Yuen Hung
 Sheila Chan as Lawyer Chan
 Shing Fui-On as Chen Fei Ehn
 Hung San-Nam
 Lam Wai as Hung's boyfriend 
 Lau Chun-Fai
 Leung Ming
 Lung Ming-Yan as Nam
 Wai Gei-Shun

Production
The film was shot in Hong Kong and Vietnam.

References

External links

1989 films
Hong Kong war drama films
1980s Cantonese-language films
1989 drama films
1980s war drama films
Films set in Vietnam
Films shot in Vietnam
Chinese war drama films
Films directed by Taylor Wong
1980s Hong Kong films